Plantronics, Inc. is an American electronics company — branded Poly to reflect its dual Plantronics and Polycom heritage — producing audio communications equipment for business and consumers. Its products support unified communications, mobile use, gaming and music. Plantronics is headquartered in Santa Cruz, California, and most of its products are produced in China and Mexico.

On March 18, 2019, Plantronics announced that it would change its name to Poly following its acquisition of Polycom, although it continues to trade on the New York Stock Exchange as Plantronics, Inc. (POLY; listed as PLT until May 24, 2021).

On March 28, 2022, HP Inc. announced its intent to acquire Poly for $1.7 billion in cash as it looks to bolster its hybrid work offerings, such as headsets and videoconferencing hardware. Including debt, the deal valued at $3.3 billion and closed in August 2022.

History
In the early 1960s, airline headsets were so large and cumbersome that many pilots had switched back to the use of handheld microphones for communications. The speed and complexity of jet airliners caused a need for the introduction of small, lightweight headsets into the cockpit. In 1961, United Airlines solicited new designs from anyone who was interested. Courtney Graham, a United Airlines pilot, was one of the many who thought the heavy headsets should be replaced by something lighter. He collaborated with his pilot friend Keith Larkin to create a small, functional design which was robust enough to pass airlines standards. (Larkin had been working for a small company called Plane-Aids, a Japanese import company which offered spectacles and sunglasses that contained transistor radios in their temple pieces.) The final design, incorporating two small hearing aid-style transducers attached to a headband was submitted to United Airline approval. UAL's approval of the innovative design caused Graham and Larkin to incorporate as Pacific Plantronics (now called Plantronics, Inc.) on May 18, 1961. They introduced the first lightweight communications headset, the MS-50, to the commercial marketplace in 1962.

In the mid-1960s, the Federal Aviation Agency selected Plantronics as the sole supplier of headsets for air traffic controllers, and thereafter was selected to supply headsets to the operators of the Bell Telephone company.

SPENCOMM and NASA
In 1961, NASA astronaut Wally Schirra contacted Courtney Graham, a fellow pilot, to discuss creating a design for a small, lightweight headset to be used in the Mercury spacecraft.

Pacific Plantronics assembled its Space Environmental Communications (SPENCOMM) division to begin working on a reliable solution. SPENCOMM personnel traveled to NASA's Manned Spacecraft Center (now Johnson Space Center) and Kennedy Space Center to meet with and get design feedback from Schirra and several other astronauts, including Gordon Cooper.

Together, SPENCOMM and NASA spent only 11 days to create a working microphone design for space communications and Schirra was the first to use the new communication technology during the Mercury-Atlas 8 mission. Significant redundancy was built into these headsets, as each microphone circuit had two transducers and each receiver had five transducers—in addition, the headsets were used in pairs. The use of these SPENCOMM-NASA headsets in astronaut space suits continued through the remainder of the Mercury program, the Apollo program and on to this day. The words spoken by U.S. astronaut Neil Armstrong as he stepped on the moon were transmitted through a Plantronics headset.

MS-50
Following the Pacific Plantronics partnership with NASA in the Space Program, the MS-50 headset gained recognition in the communication marketplace. The FAA, Western Electric, and companies with telephone call centers adapted the MS-50 as a replacement for existing headsets.

On May 18, 1965, U.S. Pat. No. 3,184,556 was issued to W. K. Larkin for a

StarSet
In 1970, Ken Hutchings, an engineer who had joined Pacific Plantronics, patented a device which was marketed as the "StarSet". United States Patent 3548118 describes

Wireless products

In the 1980s, Plantronics created a line of cordless products using infrared technology. Though the technology utilized was the same one being used by television remote controls, the link did not require a Federal Communications Commission (FCC) telecommunications approval. One of the first products used the infrared beam to create a communications link between a small transmitter and a base unit which was connected to the telephone network. This product was the first "echo-free" speakerphone for use in conference rooms. The small transmitter could be handheld or clipped to clothing to ensure a good pickup of the speaker's voice.

Wireless office headsets
In 2003, Plantronics introduced the CS50 wireless headset for use on office phones. Since that time, Plantronics has manufactured other wireless headsets, including the "CS70N", CS500 Series, and Savi 700 Series. In recent years there has also been strong focus on Unified Communications headsets and speakers.

Mobile and Bluetooth mobile headsets

Plantronics manufactures mobile headsets, including a line of Bluetooth headsets for mobile phones. The Pulsar 590, for example, is designed for use with Bluetooth- and A2DP-enabled cellphones.

Computer and gaming headsets
Plantronics manufactured headsets for PC audio and online and console gaming via its GameCom and .Audio and RIG Gaming labels. Plantronics entered the multimedia headset market in 1999 with the release of the HS1 and the DSP-500 headsets, the latter featuring a built-in digital signal processing card. In 2002, Plantronics and Microsoft created the headset for the Xbox Communicator, the first headset to enable voice communication with Xbox Live. The company created a special headset for the Xbox as a tie-in with the videogame Halo 2 in 2004.  Plantronics exited the gaming and consumer markets in 2019, focusing on enterprise collaboration with its Poly brand.

Corporate expansion and acquisitions
Plantronics has expanded into other segments of the audio equipment market through acquisitions.

Clarity
In 1986, Plantronics acquired Walker Equipment, Ringgold, Georgia, a manufacturer of amplified handsets and telephones. The Clarity products were created to enhance telephone usability for those with hearing impairment. Walker later acquired Ameriphone in 2002, and became Walker Ameriphone before changing its name to Clarity; Clarity is now a US supplier of amplified telephones. In February 2015, Plantronics released the Clarity 340 handset style phone for UC communications.

Altec Lansing
In 2005, Plantronics acquired computer speaker manufacturer Altec Lansing for approximately $166 million. In spite of a corporate makeover  the brand continued to struggle and was acquired by Profit Equity in October 2009 for approximately $18 million.

Volume Logic
Plantronics later acquired Octiv, Inc. in March 2005 as one of its brands and renamed it as the Volume Logic division. Octiv produced an audio toolset for creating 5.1 surround sound soundtracks. Although the Volume Logic series of applications have since been discontinued, the underlying technology has been adapted for use in Plantronics telephony products.

Polycom 
On March 28, 2018, Plantronics announced it would acquire Polycom for approximately $2 billion.

2005 to present
In October 2016, long-time chief executive S. Kenneth Kannappan retired and was replaced by Joe Burton, who had joined in 2011.

On February 10, 2020, Plantronics announced the appointment of Robert Hagerty as interim CEO, replacing Joe Burton.

Gallery

References

Further reading

External links

 

1961 establishments in California
American companies established in 1961
Audio equipment manufacturers of the United States
Bluetooth
Companies based in Santa Cruz, California
Companies formerly listed on the New York Stock Exchange
Electronics companies established in 1961
Headphones manufacturers
Manufacturing companies based in California
2022 mergers and acquisitions
Hewlett-Packard acquisitions
Computer companies of the United States
Software companies of the United States
Computer hardware companies